Gurutalawa (ගුරුතලාව) is a rural town in Sri Lanka. It is located in Badulla District of Uva Province, Sri Lanka.

The famous St. Thomas' College is located in Gurutalawa.

External links
 Jummah Mosque

See also
Towns in Uva

References

Towns in Badulla District